Kabelo Kgosiang (born 19 September 1978) is a Botswana footballer who plays as a midfielder for Prisons XI. He played for the Botswana national football team between 1999 and 2004.

See also
Football in Botswana

References

External links

Association football midfielders
Botswana footballers
Botswana international footballers
1973 births
Living people